Bogursukov is a rural locality (a khutor) in Beloselskoye Rural Settlement of Krasnogvardeysky District, Adygea, Russia. The population was 182 as of 2018. There are 3 streets.

Geography 
Bogursukov is located 19 km southeast of Krasnogvardeyskoye (the district's administrative centre) by road. Novosevastopolskoye is the nearest rural locality.

References 

Rural localities in Krasnogvardeysky District